Washington High School is the rural public high school in Washington, Iowa.  It is a member of the Washington Community School District.  The building was built in 1918 and is still currently used.  Construction of a new building conjoined with the existing junior high began in July 2010 with an estimated completion date set for Fall 2012, 96 years after the opening of the present structure.  The school runs on block schedule with 4, 86-minute blocks.  The year is divided up into 4 Academic terms.  The average graduating class is around 110 students.

Demon athletics has long been a strong competitor in the area, having participated in state championships in several sports.  The school's yearbook staffers have won several state and national awards over the years.  WHS's Physics Olympics team took first place in the state competition in 2010.

Many graduates of the school go on to 2-year community colleges or 4-year public or private institutions in the area.

Athletics
The Demons compete in the Southeast Conference in the following sports:

Baseball (boys)
Basketball (boys and girls)
 Boys' 1986 Class 2A State Champions
 Girls' - 3-time Class 3A State Champions(1999, 2000, 2001)  
Cross Country (boys and girls)
Football
Golf (boys and girls)
 2008 Class 1A Coed State Champions
 Girls - 2-time Class 3A State Champions (2007, 2008)
Soccer (boys and girls)
Softball (girls)
Swimming (boys and girls)
Tennis (boys and girls)
Track and Field (boys and girls)
 Boys' 1998 3A State Champions
Volleyball (girls)
Wrestling

See also
 List of high schools in Iowa

Notable alumni
 
 
  (Class of 1923)

References

External links
 

Washington, Iowa
Public high schools in Iowa
Schools in Washington County, Iowa
1912 establishments in Iowa